Victor Simões, full name Victor Simões de Oliveira (born March 23, 1981, in Rio de Janeiro) is a Brazilian footballer who last played for Umm Salal SC in the Qatar Stars League.

Career
Victor began his career in 2001 at Flamengo, before transferring to Tombense. After two years in Brazil, he was transferred to Germinal Beerschot, a Belgian club.

After just one season, he joined Club Brugge in January 2004. He secured his position in the starting XI in Bruges, participating in 23 league matches and 5 matches in the European Cup. He won the Belgian Supercup 2004 and a year later the title of Belgian champion. But in the summer of 2005, Victor became confined to the bench as he did not receive the confidence of new coach Jan Ceulemans.

By the end of the year, he is relegated to the B team, and then was loaned in January 2006 to his former club Germinal Beerschot. He did not make any appearance until the end of the season, and then returned to Brazil, Figueirense.

Victor played for around a year at his new club, then joined the Chunnam Dragons South Korean club in summer 2007. After his spell at the South Korean club, he returned to Brazil again, joining Botafogo, and winning Taça Guanabara.

He was then loaned in January 2010 to Saudi club Al-Ahli Jeddah, winning 2011 King Cup of Champions in final against Ittihad after drawing 0–0, Victor scored the last penalty-kick in a 4–2 win. After his loan spell, Victor was transferred to Al-Ahli permanently. Victor was the joint top scorer along with Nasser in 2011–12 SPL, helping Al-Ahli finish second. Victor also won the 2012 King Cup of Champions, against Al-Nasr in a final that ended 4–1.

He joined Umm Salal in January 2014 after leaving Al-Ahli. but he was released from his contract at the end of the season.

On 19 June 2015, FC Goa announced that Victor will be part of the first team squad of the Indian club for the 2015 Indian Super League season. Victor left Goa at the end of October without playing a game for the club, due to injury.

Club career statistics

Club

Honours

Club

Winners

Club Brugge
Jupiler League 2004-05
Belgian Supercup 2004
Botafogo
Taça Guanabara 2009
Al-Ahli
2011 King Cup of Champions
2012 King Cup of Champions

Individual
Al-Ahli Player of the Season: 2010–11
2011–12 Saudi Professional League: Top Scorer
2010 Saudi Crown Prince Cup: Top Scorer
2007 Copa do Brasil: Top Scorer

References

Personal site

1981 births
Brazilian footballers
Association football forwards
Living people
Figueirense FC players
Beerschot A.C. players
Club Brugge KV players
Botafogo de Futebol e Regatas players
Jeonnam Dragons players
Expatriate footballers in Belgium
K League 1 players
Brazilian expatriate footballers
Brazilian expatriate sportspeople in Belgium
Expatriate footballers in South Korea
Expatriate footballers in Saudi Arabia
Expatriate footballers in Qatar
Expatriate footballers in India
Campeonato Brasileiro Série A players
Belgian Pro League players
Qatar Stars League players
Indian Super League players
Brazilian expatriate sportspeople in South Korea
Brazilian expatriate sportspeople in Saudi Arabia
Al-Ahli Saudi FC players
FC Goa players
Brazilian expatriate sportspeople in India
Saudi Professional League players
Footballers from Rio de Janeiro (city)